Modern republicanism is a contemporary political ideology centered on citizenship in a state organized as a modern republic.

During the Enlightenment, anti-monarchism extended beyond the civic humanism of the Renaissance. Classical republicanism, still supported by philosophers such as Rousseau and Montesquieu, was only one of several theories seeking to limit the power of monarchies rather than directly opposing them.

Liberalism and socialism departed from classical republicanism and fueled the development of the more modern republicanism.

By region and states

Latin America 
Republicanism helped inspire movements for independence in former Spanish colonies of Latin America in the early nineteenth century, and republican ideals and political designs were influential in the new Latin American republics.

Latin American republicans drew inspiration from classic and enlightenment traditions, as well as from developments in France and the United States. The role of republicanism in Spanish-speaking Latin America has attracted renewed interest from scholars. During the middle of the nineteenth century, many Spanish Americans saw their experiments in republicanism as placing the region on the "vanguard" of political developments, according to historian James Sanders.

Republicanism informed the development of key political institutions in the region, including ideals of citizenship and the creation of civilian militias. Republicanism often enjoyed broad public support. Shared republicanism also shaped the region's diplomatic traditions, especially the focus on regional confederation, international law, sovereign equality, and ideals of an inclusive international society.

Diplomats and international jurists in Latin America, such as Andrés Bello, shaped a tradition of "republican internationalism" that connected domestic republican ideals and practices with the region's emerging place in international society. Until Brazil's transition from monarchy to republic at the end of the nineteenth century, the question of form of government often produced disputes in regional diplomacy and in calls for international conferences.

Many key political figures in the region identified as republicans, including Simón Bolívar, José María Samper, Francisco Bilbao, and Juan Egaña. Several of these figures produced essays, pamphlets, and collections of speeches that drew upon and adapted the broader tradition of republican political thought.

The British Empire and the Commonwealth of Nations

In some countries of the British Empire, later the Commonwealth of Nations, republicanism has taken a variety of forms.

Australia

In Australia, the debate between republicans and monarchists is still active, and republicanism draws support from across the political spectrum. Former Prime Minister Malcolm Turnbull was a leading proponent of an Australian republic prior to joining the centre-right Liberal Party, and led the pro-republic campaign during the failed 1999 Australian republic referendum. After becoming Prime Minister in 2015, he confirmed he still supports a republic, but stated that the issue should wait until after the reign of Queen Elizabeth II. The centre-left Labor Party officially supports the abolition of the monarchy and another referendum on the issue.

Barbados

In Barbados, the government gave the promise of a referendum on becoming a republic in August 2008, but it was postponed due to the change of government in the 2008 election. A plan to becoming a republic was still in place in September 2020, according to the current PM, with a target date of late 2021.

On 22 March 2015, Prime Minister Freundel Stuart announced that Barbados will move towards a republican form of government "in the very near future". His government was defeated in the next election.

In September 2020, the government of Prime Minister Mia Mottley announced that Barbados intended to become a republic by 30 November 2021, the 55th anniversary of its independence. The plan would require a two-thirds majority vote in both houses of Parliament.

On 12 October 2021, incumbent Governor-General of Barbados Dame Sandra Mason was jointly nominated by the prime minister and leader of the opposition as candidate for the first president of Barbados, and was subsequently elected on 20 October. Mason took office on 30 November 2021.

Belize
The Belize Progressive Party supports republicanism and in the past  the Belizean Nationalist Movement did too in the 1930s–1950s.

Canada

Canadian republicans call for the replacement of the Canadian system of federal constitutional monarchy with a republican form of government. These beliefs are expressed either individually—usually in academic circles—or through the country's one republican lobby group: the Citizens for a Canadian Republic.

Debate between monarchists and republicans in Canada has been taking place since before the country's confederation in 1867, though it has rarely been of significance since the rebellions of 1837. Open support for republicanism only came from the Patriotes in the early 19th century, the Red River Métis in 1869, and minor actions by the Fenians throughout the 19th century. However, paralleling the changes in constitutional law that saw the creation of a distinct Canadian monarchy, the emergence in the 1960s of Quebec nationalism, and the evolution of Canadian nationalism, the cultural role and relevance of the monarchy altered and was sometimes questioned in certain circles, while continuing to receive support in others.

Gambia
The successful 1965 and 1970 Gambian referendums replaced Queen Elizabeth II as the head of state in favour of a republic.

Grenada
The Grenada United Labour Party advocates Grenada becoming a republic.

Ireland

Jamaica

Andrew Holness, the current Prime Minister of Jamaica, has announced that his government intends to begin the process of transitioning to a republic.

New Zealand

New Zealand republicanism dates back to the 19th century, although until the late 20th century it was a fringe movement. The current main republican lobby group, New Zealand Republic, was established in 1994. Because New Zealand's constitution is uncodified, a republic could be enacted by statute, as a simple act of parliament. However, it is generally assumed that this would only occur following a nationwide referendum. Several prime ministers and governors-general have identified themselves as republicans, although no government has yet taken any meaningful steps towards enacting a republic. Public opinion polls have generally found that a majority of the population favour retaining the monarchy.

Pakistan
The Pakistani Republican Party  supported the Constitution of Pakistan of 1956. Other republican parties in Pakistan are the Balochistan-based Baloch Republican Party and the Jamhoori Wattan Party. Prominent Pakistani republicans include: Akbar Bugti, 
Talal Akbar Bugti, Khan Abdul Jabbar Khan,Abdur Rashid Khan, Iskander Mirza, Muzaffar Ali Khan Qizilbash and Feroz Khan Noon.

Saint Vincent and the Grenadines
In the Saint Vincent and the Grenadines, the failed 2009 Vincentian constitutional referendum was in favour of abolishing the monarchy. Currently republicanism is supported by the Unity Labour Party, including its leader Ralph Gonsalves, the Prime Minister, the Democratic Republican Party, The SVG Party, United Progressive Party.

South Africa
In South Africa, republicanism in the 1960s was identified with the supporters of apartheid, who resented British interference in their treatment of the country's black population.

Tuvalu
Both the 1986 Tuvaluan constitutional referendum and the 2008 Tuvaluan constitutional referendum had republican options, though both referendums' results came out in favour of keeping the monarchy.

United Kingdom

Republican groups are also active in the United Kingdom. The major organisation campaigning for a republic in the United Kingdom is 'Republic'.

Western Europe

Belgium
Republicanism in Belgium can be dated back to the Committee of United Belgians and Liégeois, a political committee in Revolutionary France which brought together leaders of the failed Brabant and Liège Revolutions (1789–1791) who sought to create an independent Belgian republic. They sought to create an independent republic in Belgium. The Republican Socialist Party founded 1887 was republican in nature and based mainly in the Wallonia-Hainaut areas.

The current main nationwide movement representing republican interests is Republican Circle. However republican ideas can be mainly found among proponents of the partition of Belgium into Flanders and Wallonia.

Within the Flemish movement, the declaration of independence of the county of Flanders on 4 January 1790, during the Brabantine Revolution was based on republican ideals. Currently the Flemish nationalist-separatist Vlaams Belang support a republic.

Within the Walloon Movement, the Rattachist movement is particularly republican, represented by the French National-Collectivist Party, Rassemblement Wallonie France and the regionalist Walloon Rally.

France

The French version of republicanism after 1870 was called "Radicalism"; it became the Radical Party, a major political party. In Western Europe, there were similar smaller "radical" parties. They all supported a constitutional republic and universal suffrage, while European liberals were at the time in favor of constitutional monarchy and census suffrage. Most radical parties later favored economic liberalism and capitalism. This distinction between radicalism and liberalism had not totally disappeared in the 20th century, although many radicals simply joined liberal parties. For example, the Radical Party of the Left in France or the (originally Italian) Transnational Radical Party, which still exist, focus more on republicanism than on simple liberalism.

Liberalism, was represented in France by the Orleanists who rallied to the Third Republic only in the late 19th century, after the comte de Chambord's 1883 death and the 1891 papal encyclical Rerum novarum.

But the early Republican, Radical and Radical-Socialist Party in France, and Chartism in Britain, were closer to republicanism. Radicalism remained close to republicanism in the 20th century, at least in France, where they governed several times with other parties (participating in both the Cartel des Gauches coalitions as well as the Popular Front).

Discredited after the Second World War, French radicals split into a left-wing party – the Radical Party of the Left, an associate of the Socialist Party – and the Radical Party "valoisien", an associate party of the conservative Union for a Popular Movement (UMP) and its Gaullist predecessors. Italian radicals also maintained close links with republicanism, as well as with socialism, with the Partito radicale founded in 1955, which became the Transnational Radical Party in 1989.

Increasingly, after the fall of communism in 1989 and the collapse of the Marxist interpretation of the French Revolution, France increasingly turned to republicanism to define its national identity. Charles de Gaulle, presenting himself as the military savior of France in the 1940s, and the political savior in the 1950s, refashioned the meaning of republicanism. Both left and right enshrined him in the Republican pantheon.

Luxembourg
In the 1919 Luxembourg referendum a republic form of statehood was overwhelmingly rejected.

The Netherlands

The Netherlands have known two republican periods: the Dutch Republic (1581–1795) that gained independence from the Spanish Empire during the Eighty Years' War, followed by the Batavian Republic (1795–1806) that after conquest by the French First Republic had been established as a Sister Republic. After Napoleon crowned himself Emperor of the French, he made his brother Louis Bonaparte King of Holland (1806–1810), then annexed the Netherlands into the French First Empire (1810–1813) until he was defeated at the Battle of Leipzig. Thereafter the Sovereign Principality of the United Netherlands (1813–1815) was established, granting the Orange-Nassau family, who during the Dutch Republic had only been stadtholders, a princely title over the Netherlands, and soon William Frederick even crowned himself King of the Netherlands. His rather autocratic tendencies in spite of the principles of constitutional monarchy met increasing resistance from Parliament and the population, which eventually limited the monarchy's power and democratised the government, most notably through the Constitutional Reform of 1848. Since the late 19th century, republicanism has had various degrees of support in society, which the royal house generally dealt with by gradually letting go of its formal influence in politics and taking on a more ceremonial and symbolic role. Nowadays, popularity of the monarchy is high, but there is a significant republican minority that strives to abolish the monarchy altogether.

Spain

There is a renewed interest in republicanism in Spain after two earlier attempts: the First Spanish Republic (1873–1874) and the Second Spanish Republic (1931–1939). In a survey conducted in 2007 reported that 69% of the population prefer the monarchy to continue, compared with 22% opting for a republic. In a 2008 survey, 58% of Spanish citizens were indifferent, 16% favored a republic, 16% were monarchists, and 7% claimed they were Juancarlistas (supporters of continued monarchy under King Juan Carlos I, without a common position for the fate of the monarchy after his death). In recent years, there has been a tie between Monarchists and Republicans.

Scandinavia

Faroe Islands
The Faroese independence movement has a strong republican element, most notably represented by the Republic Party.

Iceland
The overwhelmingly passed 1944 Icelandic constitutional referendum effectively abolished the monarchy in favour of a republic. The 1 December 1918 Danish–Icelandic Act of Union had granted Iceland independence from Denmark, but maintained the two countries in a personal union, with the King of Denmark also being the King of Iceland. In the two-part referendum, voters were asked whether the Union with Denmark should be abolished, and whether to adopt a new republican constitution. Both measures were approved, each with more than 98% in favour. Voter turnout was 98.4% overall, and 100% in two constituencies, Seyðisfirði and Vestur-Skaftafjellssýsla.

Norway

In the period around and after the dissolution of the union between Norway and Sweden in 1905, an opposition to the monarchy grew in Norway, and republican movements and thoughts continue to exist to this day.

Sweden

In Sweden, a major promoter of republicanism is the Swedish Republican Association, which advocates for a democratic ending to the Monarchy of Sweden.

Other

Japan

Anti-monarchism in Japan was a minor force during the twentieth century. The Japanese Communist Party is the most prominent advocate of a non-monarchic system and has in the past demanded the abolition of the emperor system outright.

Turkey

In 1923 after the fall of the Ottoman Empire an inherited aristocracy and sultinate suppressed republican ideas until the successful republican revolution of Mustafa Kemal Atatürk in the 1920s. Republicanism remains one of the six principles of Kemalism.

United States

Republicanism became the dominant political value of Americans during and after the American Revolution. The Founding Fathers were strong advocates of republican values, especially Thomas Jefferson, Samuel Adams, Patrick Henry, Thomas Paine, Benjamin Franklin, John Adams, James Madison and Alexander Hamilton. However, in 1854, social movements started to harness values of abolitionism and free labour. These burgeoning radical traditions in America became epitomized in the early formation of the Republican Party, known as "red republicanism." The efforts were primarily led by political leaders such as Alvan E. Bovay, Thaddeus Stevens, and Abraham Lincoln.

See also
 Abolition of monarchy
 Criticism of monarchy

References

External links

 

Republicanism